This is a List of Iranian drone bases, containing military bases from which Iran operates unmanned aerial vehicles.

Abroad

References 

Unmanned aerial vehicles of Iran